The enzyme streptomycin-6-phosphatase (EC 3.1.3.39) catalyzes the reaction

streptomycin 6-phosphate + H2O  streptomycin + phosphate

This enzyme belongs to the family of hydrolases, specifically those acting on phosphoric monoester bonds.  The systematic name is streptomycin-6-phosphate phosphohydrolase. Other names in common use include streptomycin 6-phosphate phosphatase, streptomycin 6-phosphate phosphohydrolase, and streptomycin-6-P phosphohydrolase.  This enzyme participates in streptomycin biosynthesis.

References

 
 

EC 3.1.3
Enzymes of unknown structure